Josip Magdić (born 19 December 1985) is a footballer who plays as an attacking midfielder for the Australian club Melbourne Knights.

Club career
He started his career with WA Premier League club Floreat Athena, later signing with Croatian second division side NK Slavonija Požega. He returned to Floreat Athena for the 2006 season and was playing so well that he was snapped up halfway through the season by Perth Glory. In the 2006/2007 A-League season Magdić played 5 times and scored 1 goal, but he did not remain on the Perth Glory roster for the 2007/2008 season as Ron Smith did not renew his contract. After a great season with Floreat Athena in 2007, in which he helped the club to their first Premiership in 10 years, he received a trial with A-League club Queensland Roar before signing on for Perth Glory for the second time but he never played a game due to injury.
Magdić signed for the Melbourne Knights competing in the Victorian Premier League for the 2010 season.

A-League career statistics
(Correct as of 20 September 2008)

External links
 Perth Glory profile

1985 births
A-League Men players
Living people
Melbourne Knights FC players
Perth Glory FC players
Australian soccer players
Croatian emigrants to Australia
Association football midfielders